The Weißjura Formation is a Limestone geologic formation located in the Swabian Jura (Swabian Alps) range, Baden-Württemberg, Germany.

Wimsener Höhle is a Karst cave in the formation. The Zwiefalter Aach river flows out through the water cave.

It preserves fossils dating back to the Jurassic period.

See also

 
 List of fossiliferous stratigraphic units in Germany

References
 

Limestone formations
Geography of Baden-Württemberg
Karst formations of Germany
Jurassic Germany
Geologic formations of Germany